This is a list of television programs that have been produced by France. It includes series made by France alone as well as those produced in collaboration with various other countries. Almost all are in the French language; exceptions to this rule are also included in this list.

Most of the programs on this list are original French creations. However, many French game shows and reality shows are based on one or more series or television show franchises from other countries, most commonly from the UK. These and other programs that have been remade in France are also included in another section, at the bottom of this article.

Original French programs

Action-drama

Animated

Children's series (non-animated)

Comedy

Comedy

Comedy-drama

Satire

Shortcom
Shortcom or programme court is a television program genre that is between sketch comedy and sitcom. Shortcom episodes typically range in length from one to seven minutes, though many shortcom series do include longer episodes. Un gars, une fille, based on the French-language Canadian series of the same name, began in 1999 and was the first shortcom series that was not a sequence in another series to air in France.

Sitcom

Sketch comedy

Crime

Crime drama

Legal drama

Mystery

Police comedy-drama

Police drama

Police-legal drama

Spy

Documentary series

Drama

Drama

Historical drama

Medical drama

Soap opera

Erotic/adult

Game show

News

Reality show

Religious

Speculative fiction

Horror

Science fiction

Superhero

Supernatural

Talk show

Variety show

French adaptations of television series from other countries

See also 
 Cinema of France
 Culture of France
 List of French animated television series
 List of French-language Canadian television series
 List of French-language films
 Lists of French films

References

French television-related lists

Lists of television series by country of production